Nacoleia fuscifusalis is a moth in the family Crambidae. It was described by George Hampson in 1912. It is found in Sri Lanka and Papua New Guinea.

References

Moths described in 1912
Taxa named by George Hampson
Nacoleia
Moths of Sri Lanka
Moths of New Guinea